Prather is a surname. Notable people with the surname include:

 Casey Prather (born 1991), American basketball player in the Israeli Basketball Premier League
 Chad Prather, American motivational speaker
 Colt Prather (born 1975), American country music singer-songwriter
 Guy Prather (1958–2016), American National Football League linebacker (1981–1985)
 H. Lee Prather (1886–1964), American head football and basketball coach at Northwestern State University
 Hugh Prather (1938–2010), American self-help writer
 Joan Prather (born 1950), American actress
 Joe Prather (born 1939), American politician
 Lenore L. Prather (1931-2020), American judge
 Maurice Prather (1926–2001), American cinematographer
 Richard S. Prather (1921–2007), American mystery novelist
 Rollin Prather (1925–1996), Canadian Football League player
 Victor Prather (1926–1961), American flight surgeon who died testing the "Project RAM" space suit